The Carrie Ladd was an important early steamboat on the lower Columbia and lower Willamette rivers.  The vessel established the basic design of the Columbia River steamboat, which was later used throughout the Pacific Northwest, British Columbia, Alaska, and the Yukon.

Design, Ownership and Construction
Carrie Ladd was one of the first steamboats of the Columbia River type.  Unlike most other early steamboats Carrie Ladd was built from scratch, rather from discarded hulls, works, or machinery of previous vessels.  The vessel was not particularly large, but had powerful engines, and was probably the best of the steamboats built in Oregon in the 1850s.  John T. Thomas built Carrie Ladd for Jacob Kamm, Capt. John C. Ainsworth and other co-owners.  The vessel was named the Carrie Ladd in honor of the daughter of an early Portland banker who helped arrange the financing for the Oregon Steam Navigation Company which later held a monopoly on steam navigation on the Columbia River.

Carrie Ladd was launched at Oregon City in October, 1858. The vessel was fitted up in what was considered to be first-class style for the day. The design of the Carrie Ladd, together with that of the vessel 's predecessor Jennie Clark established the elements of the Columbia River steamer.  The basic elements of the Columbia River steamer, as established by Carrie Ladd were described by Professor Mills:

Operations
Captain Ainsworth took Carrie Ladd on her trial trip February 9, 1859, from Portland, Oregon  to the lower Cascades by way of Vancouver, Wash. Terr.  From Portland to Vancouver was 16 miles along the rivers.  It was 53 miles from Portland to the lower Cascades.

Carrie Ladd covered the 16 miles to Vancouver in 1 hour 25 minutes, and the entire 53 miles to the lower Cascades in 5 hours 44 minutes.  The return from the Cascades to Portland took 4 hours 38 minutes.  These were rapid speeds for the time, especially compared to ground transport in that time of no roads.  Originally it was intended to put Carrie Ladd on the run on the lower Willamette River from Portland south to Oregon City.  However, shortly after the vessel was completed, the owners of Carrie Ladd formed the Union Transportation Company, the forerunner of the Oregon Steam Navigation Company ("OSN"), which was soon to control a monopoly on the river. Union Transportation was a pool of allied steamboat owners restricting competition and allocating the market among the pool members, and the pool assigned Carrie Ladd to the Columbia River.

Carrie Ladd received a larger share of the Columbia River traffic than any other steamer in the pool. Having excellent power Carrie Ladd  found no difficulty in going right up to foot of the rapids at the Cascades. When the Julia Barclay was brought to Columbia River from Puget Sound there was a brief spell of competition on the Portland-Cascades route.  This soon ended when OSN bought Julia.  In the early 1860s, the two steamers ran alternately on the Cascades, each carrying from two hundred to three hundred passengers each time.

Sinking, salvage, and withdrawal from service
On June 3, 1862, while in command of Capt. James Strang on the Columbia river, the Carrie Ladd struck a rock near Cape Horn, 18 miles below the Cascades, and sank.  The passengers were rescued by the Mountain Buck and taken to the lower Cascades.  Carrie Ladd was raised following her sinking, and resumed service, but the tremendous amount of work to which the vessel was subjected during its early career had weakened the boat, and in 1864 it was converted into a barge. The engines were reused in the Nez Perce Chief.  In later years the Carrie Ladd 's boiler went to the Mountain Queen.

Notes

Further reading

 Faber, Jim, Steamer's Wake—Voyaging down the old marine highways of Puget Sound, British Columbia, and the Columbia River, Enetai Press, Seattle, WA 1985 
 Newell, Gordon R., and Williamson, Joe D., Pacific Steamboats, Superior Publishing, Seattle WA 1958

Steamboats of Oregon
Steamboats of the Columbia River
1858 ships
Passenger ships of the United States